Bodø Energi is a power company with subsidiaries that conduct grid operations, contractor services, district heating and power Sales. Bodø Energy is 100% owned by the municipality Bodø kommune.

As of December 31, 2019, the Group consists of the following companies:
 Bodø Energi AS (parent company, 100% owned by Bodø municipality)
 BE Power Sales AS (100% owned)
 BE Varme AS (100% owned)
 FJUEL Bodø AS (51% owned)
 PWR UP AS (49% owned)
 FROST Kraftentreprenør AS (51% owned)

History

External links
 http://www.fjernkontrollen.no/be-varme-as/

Electric power companies of Norway
Companies based in Bodø
Energy companies established in 1909
1909 establishments in Norway
Companies owned by municipalities of Norway